Lilia Gumerova (Russian: Гумерова, Лилия Салаватовна; born 16 December 1972) is a Russian politician serving as a senator from the Bashkortostan since 25 September 2014.

Lilia Gumerova is under personal sanctions introduced by the European Union, the United Kingdom, the USA, Canada, Switzerland, Australia, Ukraine, New Zealand, for ratifying the decisions of the "Treaty of Friendship, Cooperation and Mutual Assistance between the Russian Federation and the Donetsk People's Republic and between the Russian Federation and the Luhansk People's Republic" and providing political and economic support for Russia's annexation of Ukrainian territories.

Career 

Lilia Gumerova was born on 16 December 1972 in Uchaly, Uchalinsky District. In 1994, she graduated from the Bashkir State Pedagogical University. Afterward, she started working as a teacher of psychology at secondary school No. 10 in Uchaly. From 2001 to 2005, she worked as a head of the information and analytical department of the administration of the Uchalinsky District of Bashkiria. From 2010 to 2011, she was the Commissioner for Children's Rights in the Republic of Bashkortostan. On 13 March 2011 she was elected as a deputy of the State Assembly of the Republic of Bashkortostan of the 4th convocation. On 24 October 2012, she was appointed Deputy Prime Minister of the Republic of Bashkortostan. On 25 September 2014 she became the senator from the Bashkortostan. On 25 September 2019 she was re-appointed for the same position.

References

Living people
1975 births
United Russia politicians
21st-century Russian politicians
Members of the Federation Council of Russia (after 2000)